Abhaya Malla was the son of Aridev Malla the second Malla king of Nepal. He succeeded his father in 1216 and died during the 1255 earthquake which wiped out one third of the population of the Kathmandu Valley.

Reign

External invasions 
His reign was generally turbulent and a victim of many attacks from his neighboring kingdoms. He was attacked by Ranasura, and three times by the Tirhuts from Simrangaudh. On the third attempt in 1245, the Tirhuts, whose army was led by Ramasimhadeva, invaded as far as Gokarna but were surrounded and a part of them was massacred.

Internal conflicts 
In 1242, Kirtipur and a part of Bhadgaon were attacked by rebels who took some local residents as prisoners.

From around 1249, Jayasimha Malla of Bhadgaon and Jayabhimadeva of Banepa started gathering political powers and imprisoned significant nobles.

Death 
A disastrous earthquake on 7 June 1255 killed more than one-third of the population and left Abhaya Malla injured. He died of his injuries six days later and was succeeded by his son Jayadeva Malla.

References

Malla rulers of the Kathmandu Valley
Year of birth unknown
1255 deaths
13th-century Nepalese people
Nepalese monarchs

History of Nepal
Date of birth unknown